Calophyllum bracteatum is a species of flowering plant in the Calophyllaceae family. It is found only in Sri Lanka where it is known as වලු කින (walu kina) by local people.

References

Endemic flora of Sri Lanka
Vulnerable plants
bracteatum
Taxonomy articles created by Polbot